Hegu is a lunar impact crater that is located within Von Kármán crater on the far side of the Moon.  The crater is located south of the landing site of the Chinese Chang'e 4 lander.

The crater's name was approved by the IAU on 4 February 2019. It is based on an ancient Chinese constellation of the same name (河鼓).

References